Star Slammers was an American comic book series written and drawn by Walt Simonson. The series was Simonson's first comics and it led to his getting work in the comic book industry. The comics have been released by various publishers including Marvel Comics, Malibu Comics, Dark Horse Comics and IDW Publishing.

Publication history
The series began after Simonson joined the Washington Science Fiction Association (WSFA) after graduating college in the early 1970s with a Geology degree and did some work on the WSFA Journal. As part of their bid to host the 1974 World Science Fiction Convention (WSFC), he created what would become Star Slammers, which the group would personally print and distribute at various conventions, with each six-page episode appearing every three to four months. The final chapter appeared in time for the 1972 WSFC that saw WSFA win the vote. He rated the early part of the work as "pretty good fan art" which, by the end, had become "marginally professional", so bound the second half of the story into one volume and used it as his portfolio. Carmine Infantino, who was the editor-in-chief at DC Comics, saw this portfolio and got him bits of work at DC; six months later, editor Archie Goodwin gave him his breakthrough—drawing "Manhunter", a backup feature in DC's Detective Comics written by Goodwin.

The first Star Slammers title was published by Marvel Comics as Marvel Graphic Novel No. 6 in 1983, and later in 1994 a new five-issue limited series by Malibu Comics' Bravura imprint, though only four issues out of five were published.  Dark Horse Comics published the final issue as a one-shot special in 1996. Dark Horse also published an 8-page Star Slammers story titled "Fever Dream" in Dark Horse Presents #114 (1996) that is a prelude to the 1994 Malibu series.

In 2014 IDW Publishing republished the Marvel and Malibu material in an eight-issue reprint limited series, with the initial 60-page graphic novel broken down into the first three issues for which he created new covers and introductory pages.

Simonson has said that he has plotted out another eight-part Star Slammers story that he would like to get around to when he is less busy. The series was re-colored by Len O'Grady because "the second series was at the dawn of the age of digital color and, to be frank, left a lot to be desired and had dated hard over the intervening twenty years" and Simonson has said: "It's a director's cut in terms of the color. The original was largely colored by my wife and me. The '90s series were colored by digital means. It was all over the map".

Collected editions
The remastered series from IDW has been collected into a single volume:
 Star Slammers: The Complete Collection (IDW Publishing, hardcover, 300 pages, May 2015)

References

External links

1983 comics debuts
Comics by Walt Simonson
Dark Horse Comics titles
IDW Publishing titles
Marvel Comics graphic novels